Husn Banu (1919 – 1977) was a Bollywood actress who was famous as a stunt actress after "Hanterwali Nadia" and later worked as supporting actress in films in 1930s to 1970s. She was born in 1919 in Singapore.

Early life
Husn Banu was born as Roshan Ara on 8 February 1919 in Singapore. She was the daughter of actress Sharifa Bai (1930s) and aunt of actress Nazima. She was admitted to a high school in Mumbai and passed 12th standared from there. She was fluent in English, Gujarati, Marathi, Urdu, Bengali and Hindi . She was also proficient in singing and dancing.

Career
Like her mother Husn Banu started her career in Calcutta. She started her career under the direction of Nitin Bose in New Theatre’s film Daku Mansoor with actress Umasashi and K.L. Saigal in lead role in the year1934.  The cast of the film included
K. L. Saigal, Uma Shashi, Prithviraj Kapoor, Husnbanu, Pahari Sanyal and Nemo. Daku Mansoor was actress Husn Banu’s debut film. Her mother Shareefa was not happy with the payments of New Theatre and she brought her to Bombay where Husn Banu started getting roles in Wadia films. But only in C grade stunt action films were offered to her. After 1940, she was success to got roles from two social films made by Bharat Laxmi films . In 1941 she acted two films from Bhavnani productions and National studios. Thereafter she got only small or side roles.
In 1941,  Husn Banu was selected for a film named Dhandora opposite Noor Mohammad Charlie in main role,  Husn Bano acted about 53 films and sang 44 songs in 16 films in her lifetime.

Personal life 
Later she married Wadia’s director Aspi Irani with whom she had a longtime affair. She worked in films in both lead and character role till her death in 1977. Her last film was Akhari Sajda .  She made a big house named by her mother Shareefa,  ‘Shareefa Manzil’ in Dadar, Bombay. On 23-11-1986, morning her husband Aspi Irani left home for some work and he simply disappeared. He was declared as a “Missing Person” by the police and never returned.
Husn Banu was so beautiful and glamorous that she featured in Lux Soap advertisement in the early 1940s.
. Movie named Jawani (1942) is her career’s best film as an actress.  She sang in Prem Nagar (1940) which was Naushad’s debut film as a music director. 
Husn Bano was one of the first actresses to whom famous singer Noor Jehan (who was later gone to Pakistan after independence) lent her voice in film Dost in 1944.

References

External links
 

Indian film actresses
1919 births
1977 deaths